Paul Wesselingh (born 11 October 1961) is an English professional golfer who plays on the European Senior Tour.

Career
Wesselingh was born in Liverpool. He turned professional in 1985 but opted for a career as a club professional rather than attempting a touring career, due to his desire to stay close to his young family. His club career culminated in a position as senior professional at Kedleston Park Golf Club in Derbyshire, where he succeeded former European Tour player David J. Russell. During this stage of his career, Wesselingh won the European Club Professionals Championship, played three times in The Open Championship and played on three GB&I teams against the USA in the PGA Cup.

Upon turning 50 in 2011, Wesselingh opted to play on the European Senior Tour, coming through the qualifying school at the end of that year. He was runner-up in his first tournament, and claimed his first win three events later at the ISPS Handa PGA Seniors Championship. Wesselingh defended the ISPS Handa PGA Seniors Championship in 2013, winning by four strokes for his second win on the seniors tour. Victories as such lead to him receiving the Rookie of the Year in 2012. Following his early success on the European Seniors Tour, he continued making himself a strong contender in the years to follow. 2013 saw his most successful year to date, winning five tournaments including the tour championship event held at Belle Mare Plage resort in Mauritius, earning him the number one spot for the tours Order of Merit for the 2013 season.

Professional wins (15)

Other wins (7)
1994 PGA North Region
2002 European Club Professionals Championship, Derbyshire Matchplay
2003 Derbyshire Strokeplay
2005 Lombard Trophy
2006 Glenmuir Club Professional Championship
2008 Midland Invitational

European Senior Tour wins (8)

*Note: The 2012 ISPS Handa PGA Seniors Championship was shortened to 54 holes due to rain.

European Senior Tour playoff record (3–0)

Results in major championships

Note: Wesselingh only played in The Open Championship.

CUT = missed the half-way cut
"T" = tied

References

External links

English male golfers
European Senior Tour golfers
PGA Tour Champions golfers
Sportspeople from Liverpool
Sportspeople from Derby
1961 births
Living people